The 84th Indianapolis 500 was held at the Indianapolis Motor Speedway in Speedway, Indiana on Sunday, May 28, 2000. After four years of an ongoing organizational dispute and "split" in Indy car racing, Chip Ganassi Racing became the first major CART-based team to compete at the race since 1995. The Ganassi team of Jimmy Vasser and Juan Pablo Montoya competed as a one-off entry, and were well received by fans and fellow competitors. Both drivers were quickly up to speed with the IRL regulars, and were expected to be favorites in both qualifying and on race day. Also making a heralded return to Indianapolis was two-time winner Al Unser Jr. who had switched full-time to the IRL in 2000.

During qualifying, defending IRL champion Greg Ray took the pole position. However, on race day, reigning CART champion Juan Pablo Montoya dominated the race. Montoya led 167 laps, and cruised to victory, becoming the first rookie winner since Graham Hill in 1966. It was the first of two Indy victories for Montoya (2000, 2015). Buddy Lazier, the 1996 winner, and eventual season champion, finished second, his second runner-up finish at Indy, and fifth consecutive top ten.

The 2000 race was the first to feature two female starters in the field, Lyn St. James and Sarah Fisher. The start of the race was delayed over three hours due to rain. The green flag dropped at 2:10 p.m. EST, and the race was completed shortly after 5 p.m. Seven minutes after the checkered flag, the rain returned, and doused the victory lane celebration.

The first 65 laps of the race were run under green flag conditions, a new Indy 500 record at the time. Montoya became only the fourth winner to complete the race in under three hours, and at 167.607 mph, it was the fastest Indy 500 since 1991. At the end of the season, Montoya promptly departed Indy car racing for Formula One, then went to NASCAR. He would not return for his second Indy start until 2014.

The race was sanctioned by the Indy Racing League, and was part of the 2000 Indy Racing Northern Lights Series season.

Race schedule

Rule changes
During a yellow flag caution period, when the field is one lap away from going back to green flag conditions, the pace car would now drop off the track in turn one, and the race leader would pace the field back to the green flag and the ensuing restart. This was an effort to prevent any chance of the leader(s) accidentally passing the pace car on a restart (which happened to Scott Goodyear in the 1995 race).

A year later, this would be combined with the "wave around" rule.

Time trials
Time trials were scheduled for two days in 2000, May 20–21. During practice, IRL regulars generally topped the speed charts, with different names leading nearly each day. Jimmy Vasser and Juan Pablo Montoya were quickly up to speed in the IRL machines, and each managed to lead one day of practice. Both were considered contenders for the front row. Greg Ray (223.948 mph) set the fastest lap of the week on "Fast Friday."

Pole day - Saturday May 20
Pole qualifying began at 11 a.m. The weather was cool and cloudy. Al Unser Jr. (220.293 mph) was the first car in the field. At 12:07 p.m., Eliseo Salazar took over the top spot with a run of 223.231 mph. Salazar remained on top for over an hour, as most cars waved off, awaiting better conditions.

At 1:19 p.m., Juan Pablo Montoya took to the track. His run of 223.372 mph took over the provisional pole position. Greg Ray pulled his car out of line due to handling issues, and Team Menard announced they would go out later. Jimmy Vasser went out next, and at 221.976 mph, he was not able to join his Ganassi teammate on the front row.

Later in the day, conditions improved slightly, and several cars returned to the track. At 3:49 p.m., Greg Ray completed his run at 223.471 mph, and secured the pole position. The front row of Ray, Montoya, and Salazar was separated by only 0.173 second, the closest such margin in Indy history. The front row shaped up such that the reigning champions of IRL (Ray) and CART (Montoya) would line up 1st-2nd.

A total of 23 cars qualified for the field. Lyn St. James wrecked on her first attempt, flipping the car up on its side in the south chute. Also into the wall were Jimmy Kite, Scott Harrington, rookie Memo Gidley and veteran Hideshi Matsuda. None of the drivers were injured.

Sarah Fisher (220.237 mph) qualified 19th, becoming the third female driver in Indy history.

Bump day - Sunday May 21
The second and final day of time trials opened with ten spots remaining. Raul Boesel was the first car out, and at 222.113 mph, he would be the fastest driver of the afternoon. After two wave-offs on Saturday, Billy Boat wrecked on his first attempt on Sunday. He would be forced to find a backup car.

The field was filled to 33 cars by 5:30 p.m.. Among the drivers who completed attempts were Jimmy Kite, Davey Hamilton, and popular hometown rookie Andy Hillenburg. Independent driver and co-owner Hillenburg was fielding a "throwback" entry named the Sumar Special, a gesture to the car driven by Pat O'Connor which won the pole position in 1957.

Billy Boat secured a backup car with the Foyt team, but the car (#41, previously driven by Roberto Guerrero) only had one attempt left. After stalling three times trying to pull away, Boat's first two laps were fair. The car stalled on the third lap, and his speed dropped to 150 mph. It picked up for the final lap, and he ran it at 198 mph. His four lap average was 192.105 mph, by far the slowest car in the field, and he was the first car on the bubble.

Lyn St. James and Dick Simon Racing reorganized after Saturday's crash, and she qualified comfortably. She bumped Boat with 25 minutes left in the day. With less than a minute until the 6 o'clock gun, Billy Boat climbed into another Foyt backup, (#11) a car that had not been driven all week. Boat managed a run of 218.872 mph out of the unproven machine. He shockingly bumped his way into the field as time expired.

Davy Jones attempted a comeback after breaking his neck in 1997, but he was bumped.

Starting grid

Alternates
First alternate:  Dr. Jack Miller (#21) - Bumped
Second alternate:  Scott Harrington (#17) - Bumped

Failed to qualify
  Davy Jones (#40) - Bumped
  Robby Unser (#30) - Bumped
  Dan Drinan   (#48) - Waved off
  Roberto Guerrero (#41/20T) - Waved off
  Doug Didero  (#43) - Wrecked qualifying
  Memo Gidley  (#82) - Wrecked qualifying
  Hideshi Matsuda (#20) - Wrecked qualifying & practice

Race recap

Pre-race and rain delay
On Saturday May 27, the day before the Indy 500, Juan Pablo Montoya and Jimmy Vasser participated in the CART Bosch Spark Plug Grand Prix at Nazareth Speedway. The race had been scheduled for April 11, but snow postponed it until the Saturday of Memorial Day weekend. Montoya finished 4th, and Vasser 7th.

Jason Leffler, who qualified 17th at Indy, traveled to Charlotte on Saturday to participate in the NASCAR Busch Series Carquest Auto Parts 300. Leffler finished 21st at Charlotte. Also in Charlotte for part of the week was Robby Gordon, who was preparing to attempt the Indy 500/Coca-Cola 600 "Double Duty." Gordon required a provisional starting position for Charlotte, and he would line up 42nd. P. J. Jones was scheduled to stand by for Gordon at Charlotte if he could not make it in time for the start.

On race day, Sunday May 28, the morning dawned warm and sunny, but rain was in the forecast. At 10:07 a.m., rain started to fall, and the start of the race was delayed. After three brief periods of showers, at approximately 12:40 p.m., the rain stopped and held off just long enough to complete the race. Track-drying efforts began, and at 2:01 p.m. EST, Mari Hulman George gave the command to start engines, and the field pulled away.

First half
At the start, polesitter Greg Ray took the lead. Juan Pablo Montoya settled into second, and Robby Gordon third. A fast pace over the first 20 laps saw Ray dominate, with Montoya aggressively dicing through traffic, holding a close second place.

On lap 27, the leaders went four-wide through traffic, and Montoya took the lead for the first time. There would only be 6 laps that he would not be in front for the rest of the race. A few laps later, all the leaders were into the pits for the first round of green flag pit stops. On lap 33 Montoya emerged with the lead, and began to flex some strength. His lead grew from 11.9 seconds on lap 34 to over 21 seconds on lap 55.

A blistering pace over the first 60 laps saw thus far zero yellow flags. The average speed at lap 60 (150 miles) was an all-time record 207.101 mph. Montoya held a 30-second lead over second place Jimmy Vasser. On lap 66, however, Greg Ray became caught up in a wind gust, and his car pushed into the outside wall exiting turn two. Al Unser Jr. hit a piece of debris, and punctured the radiator, causing him to drop out. It was the first caution of the day, setting a new modern era Indy record (66 laps) before the first yellow.

Montoya now led Robby Gordon and Buddy Lazier. After the restart, however, Lyn St. James crashed into the outside wall in turn 1. Sarah Fisher was collected in the incident, and also crashed.

At the halfway point, Montoya still led. Vasser was second, about 5 seconds behind.

Second half
In the second half Juan Pablo Montoya continued to dominate. His teammate Jimmy Vasser, however, started to drop down the top ten. Buddy Lazier and Jeff Ward were now in the top three, all chasing Montoya.

On lap 143, Greg Ray returned to the track after lengthy repairs. His return did not last long, as he smacked the outside wall in turn two - close to the same place he crashed earlier - and he was finally out of the race. Ray became the fourth polesitter (Woodbury, Carter, and Guerrero) to finish last.

The green came back out on lap 150, with Montoya first and Lazier close behind in second. Rookie Sam Hornish Jr. crashed on lap 158, but most of the leaders did not pit. On the restart on lap 162, Lazier made a run for the lead in turn one, but Montoya held him off.

Finish
Stan Wattles brought out the final yellow flag on lap 174 for a blown engine. Montoya and Lazier pitted, which allowed Jimmy Vasser to take over the lead. The green came out with 23 laps to go.

Vasser's lead did not last long, as Montoya got by him on lap 180. Lazier caught up to Vasser and passed him for second. Lazier set the fastest lap of the race (218.494 mph) on lap 198, but Montoya was too far ahead. Montoya pulled away and won the Indianapolis 500 in his first start by 7.1839 seconds over 1996 winner Buddy Lazier.

Box score

 = former Indianapolis 500 winner;  = Indianapolis 500 rookie

All entrants utilized Firestone tires.

Legacy
After the 2000 CART season, Juan Pablo Montoya signed with the Williams Formula One team, and thus did not return to defend his Indianapolis 500 championship in 2001. Later, Montoya switched to the NASCAR Sprint Cup Series, and did not race again in the Indianapolis 500 until 2014.   He has also raced in the U.S. Grand Prix, Brickyard 400, and Brickyard Grand Prix, all held at IMS. He won the 99th edition of the Indianapolis 500 in 2015.

The 2000 Indy 500 marked a turning point in the ongoing, five-year "split" between IRL and CART. While neither side was prepared to make concessions towards a unification or buyout, it became evident that sponsors in the CART series desired to have their teams participate in the Indianapolis 500 to benefit from the increased exposure. Ganassi's arrival, and subsequent domination of the event led other CART-based teams to follow suit. Penske Racing considered an entry for 2000, but decided against it due to lack of preparation time. Furthermore, at the time, they only owned Riley & Scott chassis, which were deemed uncompetitive. Instead, Roger Penske and Tim Cindric lent support to Jason Leffler's car at Treadway Racing. The following year additional teams (namely Penske and Team Green) returned to Indianapolis with competitive efforts. By 2004, nearly all of the major teams from CART/Champ Car had either entered singly at Indy, or defected completely to the Indy Racing League. Despite these moves, a formal unification would not take place until 2008.

CART-based Walker Racing also "crossed picket lines" to enter the 2000 race, but received little publicity for doing so. Noticeably neither of the team's full-time CART drivers (Bryan Herta and Shinji Nakano), were part of the effort. The attention for Walker was instead focused on their new driver, rookie Sarah Fisher, who would become a popular fixture in the IRL in the years to come.

Statistics
Juan Pablo Montoya won the race from the 2nd starting position. It was the first time a driver had won from the middle of the front row since Mario Andretti in 1969. From 1911–1969, the second starting position statistically produced the most race winners (ten total), more so than even the pole position (which had produced only seven winners at that time), a reflection of the Andretti curse. Montoya broke a thirty-year streak of losses by the second starting position, including many years where the no. 2 starter failed to even finish the race. As of 2022 the second starting position has not produced any additional race winners, a win–loss record of 1–52.

Second place finisher Buddy Lazier (the 1996 winner) was the only car towards the end of the race that was in striking distance of Montoya, but a combination of slower pit stops and difficulties in traffic, thwarted any chance of victory. It was Lazier's second runner-up finish in three years, and fifth straight finish in the top 7. Lazier, however, would go on to win the 2000 IRL championship.

Greg Ray (67 laps) fell just seven laps short of breaking Bill Homeier's record of 74 laps for the last place finisher.

With Goodyear announcing in October 1999 that it was leaving the sport of open wheel racing indefinitely, the Speedway lost one of its fixtures in 2000. The Goodyear Blimp had flown over the Indy 500 in most years from 1925–1999, but was absent in 2000, in what was believed to be the first time in decades.

Broadcasting

Radio
The race was carried live on the Indy Racing Radio Network. Mike King served as chief announcer. The broadcast was moved into a brand new studio on the 9th floor of the newly completed Pagoda control tower. The race was heard on 549 affiliates. Due to the rain delay, the broadcast came on-air for one hour, then signed off to wait out the delay. Hourly updates were aired, then the broadcast came back to cover the pre-race ceremonies and race in its entirety.

Several minor changes were made to the crew. Ken Double worked his final 500 on the network. Mark Jaynes moved from the pits to take over the turn three location vacated by one-year member Kevin O'Neal. Larry Rice and Mike Lewis joined the crew as pit reporters. This would be Rice's only year on the network. Vince Welch, formerly a pit reporter, left the crew and eventually would join ABC television. This was the last year of the Statistician position. Starting on 2001 there were no more full field rundowns every 25 laps.

Bob Lamey who joined the crew in 1988, and had become a fixture in turn 4, would be on the crew for the final time in 2000. Guests interviewed in the broadcast booth included Secretary of Defense William Cohen, John F. Fielder (BorgWarner), David Seuss (Northern Light), Kevin Forbes (IMS), Mark Miller (Nokia), and Ira Kisver (Pennzoil).

Television
The race was carried live flag-to-flag coverage in the United States on ABC Sports. Al Michaels returned as host, with Bob Jenkins as announcer. Arie Luyendyk, who had announced his first retirement, joined the broadcast as analyst, alongside Tom Sneva.

After a one-year absence, Jack Arute returned as a pit reporter, and Leslie Gudel was added as a fourth pit reporter. Back in the ABC studios, Robin Roberts had a small role as Wide World of Sports studio host.

Notes

References

Works cited
2000 Indianapolis 500 Daily Trackside Report for the Media
Indianapolis 500 History: Race & All-Time Stats - Official Site
2000 Indianapolis 500 Radio Broadcast, Indianapolis Motor Speedway Radio Network

Indianapolis 500 races
2000 in IndyCar
Indianapolis 500
Indianapolis 500
Indianapolis 500